Ekhagen Church is a church building at Ekhagen in Jönköping in Sweden, belonging to the Kristina-Ljungarum of the Church of Sweden. It was inaugurated on 12 May 1996 by Bishop Anders Wejryd, replacing the former temporary church that stood in Ekhagen between 1968 and mid 1995.

References

20th-century Church of Sweden church buildings
Churches in Jönköping
Churches completed in 1996
Churches in the Diocese of Växjö